Mahendragarh district is one of the 22 districts of Haryana state in northern India. The district occupies an area of 1,899 km² and has a population of 922,088 (2021census). District have 3 Sub-divisions : Narnaul, Mahendragarh and Kanina

Narnaul city is the administrative headquarters of the district and also the largest city of district. Mahendragarh is one of the very few districts in India where the name of the district and its main town are different. Mahendragarh has total 3 biggest Towns Narnaul, Mahendragarh and Kanina.

As of 2011 it is the third least populous district of Haryana (out of 21), after Panchkula and Rewari.

History

Origin of name
The district is named after Maharaja of Patiala - Mahender Singh. This area was given by the British to the prince of patiala after 1857 mutiny

Medieval rule
During the rule of Mughals, Babur assigned the area to Malik Mahdud Khan. However, later it was taken over by Patiala Riyasat. Birbal ka Chatta is very famous in Narnaul. People say the cave ends in Gurugram. Jal Mahal and Chor Guband were also made during Mughal rule.

Mahendragarh Fort
There is a fort at Mahendragarh which was built by the Maratha ruler Tantia Tope during the 19th century. This fort was named Mahendragarh in 1861 by Narendra Singh, the ruler of Patiala, in honour of his son, Mahendra Singh, and consequently the town came to be known as Mahendragarh. The name of Narnaul Nizamat was changed to "Mahendragarh Nizamat." Another nearby fort is Madhogarh Fort on the top of the hill near Madhogarh village.

Both Mahendragarh's fort and Madhogarh's fort are being restored along the lines of Pinjore Gardens to develop them as an international tourist destination as part of the Rewari-Narnaul-Mahendragarh-Madhogarh tourist circuit.

Post-independence
Mahendragarh district was formed in 1948 by grouping different tracts of erstwhile princely states: Narnaul and Mahendragarh tehsils from Patiala State, Dadri (Charkhi Dadri) from Jind State and a part of Bawal Nizamat from Nabha State. It became a part of Patiala and East Punjab States Union (PEPSU) state. On 1 November 1956, with the merger of PEPSU with Punjab, it became a part of Punjab state and with the formation of Haryana state in 1966, it became a part of the newly formed state. Rewari tehsil of Gurgaon district was added to it in 1972 but Rewari tehsil was made a separate district in 1989.

Geography
The district lies between north latitude 27°47’ to 28°26’ and east longitude 75°56’ to 76°51’. It is bounded on the north by Bhiwani,Charki dadri, jhajjar and Rewari districts, on the east by Rewari district and Alwar district of Rajasthan, on the south by Alwar, Jaipur and Sikar districts of Rajasthan, and on the west by Sikar and Jhunjhunu districts of Rajasthan.

Sub-Divisions
The Mahendragarh district is headed by an IAS officer of the rank of Deputy Commissioner (DC) who is the chief executive officer of the district. The district is divided into 3 sub-divisions, each headed by a Sub-Divisional Magistrate (SDM): Narnaul, Mahendragarh and Kanina.

Revenue tehsils
The above 3 sub-divisions are divided into 5 revenue tehsils, namely, Narnaul, Mahendragarh, Kanina, Nangal Chaudhry & Ateli and 1 revenue sub-tehsil namely Satnali.

Assembly constituencies
There are 4 Haryana Vidhan Sabha constituencies located in this district: Ateli, Mahendragarh, Narnaul and Nangal Chaudhry. All 4 are part of the Bhiwani–Mahendragarh (Lok Sabha constituency).

Economy
In 2006 the Ministry of Panchayati Raj named Mahendergarh one of the country's 250 most backward districts (out of a total of 640). It is one of the two districts in Haryana currently receiving funds from the Backward Regions Grant Fund Programme (BRGF).

Tourism
Dhosi Hill is an important tourist site in the District. Known as Chyawan Rishi Ashram it is a Vedic period site. It is here that Chyawanprash was formulated for the first time. Bhagot village have Lord Shiva  temple constructed by a Rabari.

Divisions
Mahendragarh district is divided into 5 tehsils, Narnaul, Nangal Chowdhary, Kanina Mahendragarh, and Ateli. There are 4 Vidhan Sabha constituencies in this district: Ateli, Mahendragarh, Narnaul and Nangal Chaudhry.And a Sub -Tehsil Satnali.All of these are part of Bhiwani-Mahendragarh Lok Sabha constituency.

Villages
 

Nangal Shalu

Demographics

According to the 2011 census, Mahendragarh district has a population of 922,088, This gives it a ranking of 462nd in India (out of a total of 640). Its population growth rate over the decade 2001-2011 was 13.43%. Mahendragarh has a sex ratio of 895 females for every 1000 males, and a literacy rate of 77.72%. Scheduled Castes make up 16.95% of the population.

Languages 

The local dialect of the district is Ahirwati. At the 2011 Census, the majority of the population identified their first language as either Haryanvi or Hindi.

References

External links
Mahendragarh district website

 
1948 establishments in India
Districts of Haryana